The Bernhartshöhe (Bernhart's heights) is a mountain of 549 m (1,801 ft) in the [[Stuttgart-Vaihingen
]] Part of Stuttgart, covering  the southwesternmost part of the city of Stuttgart, capital of the German Bundesland (state) of Baden-Württemberg. It is the city's highest point of elevation. Bernhartshöhe is directly adjacent to the crossing of the A 8 and A 81 motorways (Autobahnkreuz Stuttgart), two crucial traffic arteries of Southern Germany.

Stuttgart (region)